The Best American Poetry 2002, a volume in The Best American Poetry series, was edited by David Lehman, with poems chosen by guest editor Robert Creeley.

The first print run for the book was 30,000.

Amy Bracken Sparks, reviewing the book in The Plain Dealer, wrote that Creeley's choices "are not poems accessible to all; they are innovative in both concept and structure, and therefore risk losing the reader. [...] Yes, it's a bit of work when not everything is explained. Pretension lurks about, but there's always Diane Di Prima keeping everything earthbound and Sharon Olds writing yet again about her father."

Carmela Ciuraru, writing in The San Diego Union-Tribune, called Creeley's selection "bold and unconventional. Even his selections of more 'established' names prove to be those who have defied people's expectations — poets such as John Ashbery, Anne Carson, Alice Notley and John Yau." Ciuraru found Juliana Spahr's prose poem "frustratingly tedius" but called the poem by Donald Hall "beautiful".

Poets and poems included

See also
 2002 in poetry

References

External links
 Web page for contents of the book, with links to each publication where the poems originally appeared

Best American Poetry series
2002 poetry books
Poetry
American poetry anthologies